Anle Yi and Gelao Ethnic Township is an ethnic township for Yi people and Gelao people, under the administration of Dafang County in western Guizhou province, China. , it has 2 residential communities and 6 villages under its administration.

See also 
 List of township-level divisions of Guizhou

References 

Township-level divisions of Guizhou
Dafang County
Yi ethnic townships